The Summer Tour is the second concert tour by the American singer Bridgit Mendler. In 2013 the tour visited North America to support her debut album Hello My Name Is..., where it started in Burlington, Iowa and ended in Arlington, Texas. The setlist included all the songs from Hello My Name Is..., except "The Fall Song" and "Love Will Tell Us Where to Go". She also covered two songs in her performances: "Starry Eyed", by British singer Ellie Goulding, and "Animal", by American band Neon Trees.

In 2014 Mendler announced the second leg of the tour. The leg started in Charlottetown, Canada, on June 28, 2014. Mendler kept the same setlist from their previous album and included two new songs, "Fly to You" and "Deeper Shade of Us", from her upcoming second studio album. She also changed the covers, including "Magic", by British band Coldplay, and "Latch", by Disclosure and Sam Smith. In November 2014 Mendler would travel for the first time outside of North America with the tour to perform in South America in three countries, but they were cancelled.

Background and development

On June 5, 2013, Mendler announced on her website that she would have a summer tour to promote her debut album Hello My Name Is.... In the beginning of June, Mendler announced tour dates on her official website kicking off June 16 in Burlington, Iowa. On June 7, she released in her Instagram the promotional banner of the tour, created by graphic artist Ashkahn Shahparnia, and revealed some dates. On July 31, Mendler said she spent a year and a half rehearsing with her band before the tour. She introduced her band, formed by Eric Nicolau as music director on guitar and backing vocals, Roberto Cerletti in drums, Neara Russel in piano and backing vocals and Nick K in bass. In an interview with Cambio, Mendler commented about the tour saying:

"I'm so excited to tour this Summer, I get to go and meet people in different parts of the USA", Mendler also said what people would expect of the tour, "I think it's a great opportunity to me, to get to know the audience better. I feel like my music is pretty new and I haven't had a huge opportunity to tour around because I was working on Good Luck Charlie, so I'm excited to share the music with people and I hope they enjoy it."

Mendler and the band were housed in her own bus that traveled the United States and Canada for concerts. In an interview to Artist Direct, she said that she rehearsed for months for reach the emotions also live. "Actually singing the songs live has been something I've definitely had to adjust to. They're not always easy songs. I'm proud of the arrangement we have now. I'm enjoying it. On August 1, Mendler said in an interview with Cambio she will take her tour to Europe when she finished American cities, but she did not tell the dates or countries.

Promotion
Prior to the beginning of the tour, Mendler released a teaser video on her YouTube channel displaying video content. She conducted several interviews to talk about the tour and promoted it in a mini-concert for the Grammy Academy. In April 30 she released the extended play Live in London, by Universal Music, recorded at a special performance in the United Kingdom. Mendler not held shows in the country, but promoted the American leg. She said that was inspired particularly by Bob Dylan and Gwen Stefani on stage and cited their energy and presence. In interview to The Star Magazine, she also said he was inspired by the way Adele shows emotions on stage and she tried to do the same. "Adele did an amazing show. I really learned a lot about how she makes her performance because she is not a dancer, just a singer and storyteller. Adele made everyone feel as if you were in her living room. She told stories and interacted with the audience".

Concert synopsis

Mendler included all the songs from Hello My Name Is...'''s standard version, except "The Fall Song" and "Love Will Tell Us Where to Go". She also covered two songs on performances: "Starry Eyed", by British singer Ellie Goulding, and "Animal", by American band Neon Trees. In an interview to Artist Direct, Mendler said that "Rocks at My Window" and "Hold On for Dear Love" were the only songs from the album not to be performed. She learned keytar to play in "City Lights".

On February 13, 2014, Mendler revealed in an interview to KTLA Morning News  that she would tour in summer, reaching United States and Canada. The tour is a pre-promotion before her second album is released. The shows will start in Charlottetown, on June 28, 2014. Mendler kept the same setlist from their previous album and included two new songs, "Fly to You" and "Deeper Shade of Us", from her upcoming second studio album. She also changed the covers, including "Magic", by British band Coldplay, and "Latch", by Disclosure and Sam Smith. Mendler donated part of the Gross Revenue of the first four shows to charity campaign Save the Children.

In September Mendler announced that she would travel to South America for concerts, in Scream Fest festival. Her first performance outside North America would be in Argentina, on November 7, 2014. She would also perform in Chile, at Movistar Arena, and Peru, at Jockey Club. However, just some days before, organizers announced that South American shows of the tour would not take place. First, the organizating agency released a brief note informing about the cancelling in Argentina, due to "the conjunctural situation that takes place in this country, affecting the artists in Scream Fest". Just after, the Chilean organization of the concerts announced withdrawal as well. The notes promised that Bridgit would return probably in April or May 2015, but no new dates for possible shows were announced, and plans for a South American leg of Mendler's tour were definitely abandoned.

Critical reception

Tim O’Shei from The Buffalo News called the show "different – and that’s good" and cited as positive her expressions, emotions and onstage movements on stage, saying "She physically plays out the lyrics of her songs". He also compared Mendler to other young stars as Miley Cyrus and Selena Gomez, said she doesn't have the "pop presence", but it was good, because "she possesses an onstage quality they don’t" and cited personality and earthiness. Volcano Staff from North West Military said Mendler is "freaking cute" and "adorable" and she shows  all her emotions.

Keith Groller from The Morning Call'' was also positive about Mendler's voice, calling it "surprisingly good" and said she "has a much better voice, a more pleasing personality and a better idea of what her fans expect from her". He also commented that all the girls at the shows wanted to be like Mendler, and he observed that she did not undress or explore her body on stage.

Opening acts
Austin Mahone (Main dates)
Zendaya (only in Albany)
Sabrina Carpenter (only in North Charleston)
R5 (only in Aurora and Agawam)
Shane Harper (only in Oregon)
Alex Aiono (only in Arlington, Kansas City and Dubuque)
Carter Matthews (only in Burlington)  
Stereo Jane (only in Royal Oak)

Set list
Bridgit Mendler
{{hidden
| headercss = background: #ccccff; font-size: 100%; width: 65%;
| contentcss = text-align: left; font-size: 100%; width: 75%;
| header = Leg 1 (2013)
| content =  
"Hurricane"
"Top of The World"
"Forgot to Laugh"
"City Lights"
"All I See Is Gold"
"5:15"
"Starry Eyed" (Ellie Goulding cover)
"Love Will Tell Us Where To Go"
"Animal" (Neon Trees cover)
"Blonde"
"Rocks At My Window"
Encore
 "Ready or Not"
}}

Opening acts

Tour dates

Cancelled shows

Notes
Notes
A: Mendler's concert for July 20, 2013 at Six Flags Over Texas in Arlington, TX was postponed, due to a fatal accident at the theme park hours before the concert. It was rescheduled for October 13, 2013. Tickets from the original date were still good for the rescheduled date.
B: Mendler was the Tanger Outlet Fashion Camp & Tour 2014's lead artist.

References

2013 concert tours
2014 concert tours
Bridgit Mendler concert tours